United Nations Security Council resolution 699, adopted unanimously on 17 June 1991, after recalling Resolution 687 (1991) and noting the report by the Secretary-General it requested, the council, acting under Chapter VII, confirmed that the International Atomic Energy Agency and United Nations Special Commission have the authority to undertake weapons inspections in Iraq and to remove, destruct or render the weapons harmless.

The Council requested the Secretary-General to submit a report on the progress of the implementation of the current resolution, and also asked Member States to provide full assistance so that the aforementioned activities are undertaken effectively. However, only US$2 million was contributed by Member States to the commission, a small fraction of what was required. It also decided that the Government of Iraq should be liable for the costs of carrying out the inspections, due to its recent invasion of Kuwait.

See also
 Gulf War
 Invasion of Kuwait
 Iraq and weapons of mass destruction
 Iraq disarmament timeline 1990–2003
 Iraq–Kuwait relations
 Sanctions against Iraq
 List of United Nations Security Council Resolutions 601 to 700 (1987–1991)

References

External links
 
Text of the Resolution at undocs.org

 0699
 0699
1991 in Iraq
Iraq and weapons of mass destruction
 0699
June 1991 events